Ruth Ziesak (born 9 February 1963) is a German soprano in opera and concert.

Career 
Ruth Ziesak studied voice at the Frankfurt University of Music and Performing Arts with Elsa Cavelti and Christoph Prégardien. She has been a member of the Municipal Theatre Heidelberg since 1988 and the Deutsche Oper am Rhein in 1990.

She appeared in roles of Mozart's operas, such as Pamina in The Magic Flute (at the Salzburg Festival 1991 and recorded with Georg Solti), Servilia in La clemenza di Tito (recorded with Nikolaus Harnoncourt) or the Countess in Le nozze di Figaro in Glyndebourne and with the Zurich Opera.

In 2011 she performed the Liebesliederwalzer of Brahms and Spanische Liebeslieder op. 138 of Schumann with Anke Vondung, Werner Güra and Konrad Jarnot at the Rheingau Musik Festival at Schloss Johannisberg.

As a Lieder singer she gave recitals at the festivals Kissinger Sommer and Heidelberger Frühling in collaboration with the pianists Gerold Huber and András Schiff.

She is on the faculty of the Hochschule für Musik Saar.

Recordings 
 Joseph Haydn: Canzonetten, Gerold Huber, piano, Capriccio

References

External links 
 
 Ruth Ziesak (Soprano) on Bach Cantatas Website
 Ruth Ziesak on the website of the Hochschule für Musik Saar (in German)
 Entries for recordings by Ruth Ziesak on WorldCat

Living people
1963 births
Musicians from Hesse
People from Main-Taunus-Kreis
German operatic sopranos
Academic staff of the Hochschule für Musik Saar
Frankfurt University of Music and Performing Arts alumni
20th-century German  women opera singers
21st-century German  women  opera singers